The Tri-Cities Triplets were a Minor League Baseball team that represented the cities of Alabama City, Attalla and Gadsen from Alabama. They played in the Georgia–Alabama League in 1917

References

External links
Baseball Reference

Baseball teams established in 1917
Defunct minor league baseball teams
Professional baseball teams in Alabama
Defunct Georgia-Alabama League teams
Baseball teams disestablished in 1917
1917 establishments in Alabama
1917 disestablishments in Alabama
Etowah County, Alabama
Defunct baseball teams in Alabama